The 1987–88 American Indoor Soccer Association season was the fourth season for the league. Only four teams (Canton, Fort Wayne, Memphis and Milwaukee) returned from the previous year, which made for a very brief, 24-game season that ended in early February. The 1988 All-Star game had been scheduled for Tampa Bay, but with the Rowdies leaving the league to play outdoors in the American Soccer League, and three other clubs (Chicago, Toledo and league-champion Louisville) folding, the game was canceled altogether.

Two expansion teams were set to join for the following season, Dayton and Jacksonville. Rather than have only a two-team battle in a championship playoff series, the league instead opted to stage a 12-match, unbalanced, round-robin tournament called the Challenge Cup Series to determine who took home the trophy for 1987–88. The two expansion teams were also invited to play in this unique season-ending event, despite never having previously faced AISA competition. This would also give league owners a chance to see if the two new teams were really ready for the AISA. The series commenced on February 14. As the six-week long tournament rolled on, the race for cup came down to the final game of the series on April 1, which happened to match league-leaders Canton and Fort Wayne. Both teams carried 8–3 records into match. Since the winner would secure the title by one game, it became a de facto championship final. Canton held on for a 5–4 victory, and their third AISA title in four seasons.

League Standings

Challenge Cup

de facto Challenge Cup final

1987–88 AISA Challenge Cup Champions: Canton Invaders (8–4 record)

League Leaders

Scoring

Goalkeeping

League awards
Most Valuable Player: Rudy Pikuzinski, Canton 
Coach of the Year: Terry Nicholl, Memphis 
Defender of the Year: Tim Tyma, Milwaukee 
Goalkeeper of the Year: Manny Sanchez, Memphis 
Rookie of the Year: Rod Castro, Memphis

All-AISA Team

References

External links
Major Indoor Soccer League II (RSSSF)
1988 in American Soccer

1987 in American soccer leagues
1988 in American soccer leagues
1987-88